The Kuatun horned toad (Boulenophrys kuatunensis), or Kuatun spadefoot toad, is a species of frog in the family Megophryidae. It is found in southeastern China and northern Vietnam. Its name is testimony to its type locality, Kuatun (Guadun in modern spelling) village in Wuyishan, Fujian.

Its natural habitats are subtropical or tropical moist lowland forests, subtropical or tropical moist montane forests, and rivers.
It is threatened by habitat loss.

Males measure  and females  in length.

References

Boulenophrys
Amphibians of China
Amphibians of Vietnam
Taxa named by Clifford H. Pope
Amphibians described in 1929
Taxonomy articles created by Polbot